The Annals of Boyle (IPA:[ˈan̪ˠaːləˈwanʲəʃtʲəɾʲˈnˠaˈbˠuːl̪ʲə]), also Cottonian Annals, are a chronicle of medieval Ireland. The entries span the years up to 1253. It is considered one of the works that forms The Chronicle of Ireland, although in summary form compared to others.

Description
Robin Flower wrote in 1927:

The Annals used the Irish language, with some entries in Latin. Because the Annals copied its sources verbatim, the annals are useful not just for historians, but also for linguists studying the evolution of the Irish language.

The manuscript is now held in the British Library, under reference Cotton MS Titus A XXV.

See also
 Irish annals
 The Chronicle of Ireland

References

External links
"Lake Islands and a Blind Harpist" from Reader's Digest Illustrated Guide to Ireland.
Cottonian Annals
Irish chronicles and their chronology
British Library Archives and Manuscripts Cotton MS Titus A XXV

Further reading
Oxford Concise Companion to Irish Literature, Robert Welsh, 1996. 

Irish chronicles
13th-century history books
Texts of medieval Ireland
Irish manuscripts
Cotton Library